The 1955 Soviet Cup was an association football cup competition of the Soviet Union.

Competition schedule

Preliminary stage

Group 1

First round
 [Jun 14] 
 Avangard Leningrad            1-2  SPARTAK Uzhgorod 
 BUREVESTNIK Kishinev          8-0  SelKhozInstitute Kishinev 
 Burevestnik Minsk             0-2  METALLURG Zaporozhye 
 KRYLYA SOVETOV Voronezh       2-1  FShM Moskva 
 [Jun 22] 
 KRASNOVODSK                   w/o  Avangard Sverdlovsk 
 Krasny Metallurg Liepaja      2-2  Daugava Riga 
 PISHCHEVIK Odessa             5-1  FShM Kiev

First round replays
 [JuN 23] 
 KRASNY METALLURG Liepaja      w/o  Daugava Riga

Quarterfinals
 [Jul 14] 
 METALLURG Zaporozhye          2-1  Krasny Metallurg Liepaja  [aet] 
 NEFTYANIK Baku               12-1  Krasnovodsk 
 [Jul 19] 
 KRYLYA SOVETOV Voronezh       4-2  Burevestnik Kishinev 
 Spartak Uzhgorod              0-2  PISHCHEVIK Odessa         [aet]

Semifinals
 [Jul 24] 
 KRYLYA SOVETOV Voronezh       1-0  Metallurg Zaporozhye 
 NEFTYANIK Baku                w/o  Pishchevik Odessa

Final
 [Aug 3] 
 Krylya Sovetov Voronezh       0-1  NEFTYANIK Baku

Group 2

Preliminary round
 Krylya Sovetov-3 Moskva       1-2  ZENIT Kaliningrad (Moscow Region)

First round
 Mashinostroitel Kiev          1-2  METALLURG Dnepropetrovsk 
 Metallurg Leninabad           1-7  ODO Sverdlovsk 
 ODO Khabarovsk                3-4  KRASNOYE ZNAMYA Ivanovo   [aet] 
 ODO Tallinn                   1-0  Dinamo Tallinn 
 Spartak Frunze                0-3  KRYLYA SOVETOV Molotov 
 SPARTAK Kalinin               6-1  FShM Minsk 
 Spartak Samarkand             1-10 SPARTAK Tashkent 
 ZENIT Kaliningrad (M.R.)      2-0  Avangard Chelyabinsk

Quarterfinals
 KRASNOYE ZNAMYA Ivanovo       1-0  Zenit Kaliningrad (M.R.) 
 KRYLYA SOVETOV Molotov        1-0  ODO Sverdlovsk 
 ODO Tallinn                   0-3  METALLURG Dnepropetrovsk 
 SPARTAK Kalinin               2-0  Spartak Tashkent

Semifinals
 Krylya Sovetov Molotov        1-2  SPARTAK Kalinin 
 METALLURG Dnepropetrovsk      2-0  Krasnoye Znamya Ivanovo

Final
 Metallurg Dnepropetrovsk      0-1  SPARTAK Kalinin

Group 3

First round
 Polytech. Institute Kaunas    0-3  SPARTAK Vilnius 
 SHAKHTYOR Stalinogorsk        3-1  Krylya Sovetov Stupino 
 UROZHAI Alma-Ata              3-1  Metallurg Chimkent

Quarterfinals
 ENERGIYA Saratov              5-0  FShM Leningrad 
 Lokomotiv Kharkov             1-3  TORPEDO Gorkiy 
 SHAKHTYOR Stalinogorsk        2-0  DOF Sevastopol   
 Urozhai Alma-Ata              0-2  SPARTAK Vilnius

Semifinals
 [Jul 21] 
 SPARTAK Vilnius               2-1  Shakhtyor Stalinogorsk 
 TORPEDO Gorkiy                3-2  Energiya Saratov

Final
 [Aug 2] 
 SPARTAK Vilnius               1-0  Torpedo Gorkiy

Group 4

First round
 Dinamo Kutaisi                1-2  ODO Tbilisi 
 KRASNOYE ZNAMYA Leninakan     w/o  Spartak Yerevan 
 ODO Petrozavodsk              1-0  Neftyanik Krasnodar

Quarterfinals
 Krasnoye Znamya Leninakan     0-1  TORPEDO Stalingrad 
 ODO Kiev                      2-0  ODO Lvov 
 ODO Petrozavodsk              0-5  ODO Tbilisi 
 Torpedo Rostov-na-Donu        1-3  FShM Tbilisi

Semifinals
 FShM Tbilisi                  2-4  ODO Kiev 
 TORPEDO Stalingrad            1-0  ODO Tbilisi

Final
 ODO Kiev                      w/o  Torpedo Stalingrad

Final stage

First round
 [May 25] 
 DINAMO Moskva                 2-0  Trudoviye Rezervy Leningrad 
   [Yuriy Volodin 27, 62] 
 [Jun 30] 
 Torpedo Moskva                1-2  SPARTAK Minsk 
   [Valentin Ivanov 46 pen – Nikolai Makarov 7, Igor Bachurin 47] 
 [Jul 19] 
 DINAMO Tbilisi                3-2  Dinamo Kiev               [aet] 
   [Yuriy Kurtanidze 77, Boris Khasaia 78, Avtandil Gogoberidze 115 – Georgiy Grammatikopulo 14, Viktor Terentyev 69] 
 [Jul 28] 
 Zenit Leningrad               2-3  LOKOMOTIV Moskva  
   [Valeriy Tsaritsyn 11, Pyotr Katrovskiy 85 – Viktor Sokolov 61, Valentin Bubukin ?, Viktor Razumovskiy ?] 
 [Aug 2] 
 CDSA Moskva                   3-2  Krylya Sovetov Kuibyshev 
   [Vladimir Agapov-3 (1 pen) – Yozhef Betsa (C) og, Viktor Karpov] 
 [Aug 11] 
 Spartak Kalinin               1-3  SPARTAK Moskva 
   [V.Frolovskiy 27 – Anatoliy Isayev 6, Sergei Korshunov ?, Anatoliy M.Ilyin ?] 
 [Aug 19] 
 ODO Kiev                      3-2  Shakhtyor Stalino 
   [Voronin-2, Ivanov – Ivan Fedosov, Sobolev (O) og] 
 SPARTAK Vilnius               3-0  Neftyanik Baku 
   [S.Krocas, R.Kazlauskas, ? (N) og]

Quarterfinals
 [Sep 16] 
 Spartak Minsk                 0-1  LOKOMOTIV Moskva          [aet] 
   [Alexandr Filyayev 92] 
 [Oct 6] 
 Dinamo Tbilisi                0-1  CDSA Moskva 
   [Yuriy Belyayev 10] 
 [Oct 7] 
 SPARTAK Moskva                3-1  ODO Kiev 
   [Nikolai Parshin 14, ?, Sobolev (O) ? og – A.Ryzhikov 88] 
 [Oct 8] 
 DINAMO Moskva                 2-0  Spartak Vilnius 
   [Yuriy Kuznetsov 29, Vladimir Ilyin 40]

Semifinals
 [Oct 11] 
 CDSA Moskva                   1-0  Lokomotiv Moskva 
   [Yuriy Belyayev 75] 
 [Oct 12] 
 DINAMO Moskva                 4-1  Spartak Moskva 
   [Vladimir Shabrov 7, 34, Genrikh Fedosov 11, 40 – Anatoliy Isayev 46]

Final

External links
 Complete calendar. helmsoccer.narod.ru
 1955 Soviet Cup. Footballfacts.ru
 1955 Soviet football season. RSSSF

Soviet Cup seasons
Cup
Soviet Cup
Soviet Cup